Merkley may refer to:
 Henry Merkley (1758–1840), an Upper Canada politician
 Jeff Merkley (b. 1956), a United States senator
 John Alexander Merkley (1877–1944), a Saskatchewan politician
 Larry Merkley (b. 1943), a Canadian Curler
 Nick Merkley (b. 1997), a Canadian ice-hockey player
 Ryan Merkley (businessman), Chief of Staff to the office of the Executive Director of the Wikimedia Foundation
 Ryan Merkley (ice hockey) (b. 2000), a Canadian ice-hockey player
 22132 Merkley, an asteroid